Great Wigborough is a village and former civil parish, now in the parish of Great and Little Wigborough in the Colchester borough of Essex, England.

The place-name 'Wigborough' first appears in the Domesday Book of 1086, where it appears as Wicgebergha and Wighebergha. The name means 'Wicga's hill or barrow'.

In 1951 the parish had a population of 181. On 1 April 1953 the parish was abolished and merged with Little Wigborough to form "Great and Little Wigborough".

Great Wigborough is represented at the lowest tier of governance by Winstred Hundred Parish Council.

St Stephen's church dates from the 14th century and is a Grade II* listed building. Heavily damaged in the Colchester earthquake of 1884, it was extensively restored.

References

External links 

Mersea Island Museum – contains additional history of Great and Little Wigborough
St Stephen's Great Wigborough - National Lottery Heritage fund project with heritage and community information

Villages in Essex
Former civil parishes in Essex
Borough of Colchester